The 2022 Individual Long Track World Championship was the 52nd edition of the FIM speedway Individual Long Track World Championship.

The Championship was decided by a series of six Grand Prix races, beginning in Rzeszow, Poland and concluding in Roden, Netherlands.

Qualification
Competitors qualified either through the 2021 Championship, the Longtrack Challenge qualifier or be handed a Wild Card by the FIM

Venues

Final Classification

+ won run off for 7th place

References 

Individual Long Track World Championship
Individual Long Track World Championship
Individual Long Track World Championship
Individual Long Track World Championship
Individual Long Track World Championship
Individual Long Track World Championship